is a national highway connecting Tokyo and Chiba in Japan.

Route data
Length: 44.1 km (27.4 mi)
Origin: Nihonbashi, Chūō, Tokyo (originates at junction with Route 1, Route 4, Route 6, Route 15, Route 17 and Route 20)
Terminus: Chiba (ends at junction with Routes 51 and 126)
Major cities: Tokyo, Ichikawa, Chiba, Funabashi, Chiba, Narashino, Chiba and Chiba

Outline
The route is managed by East Nippon Expressway Company and Bureau of Tokyo Route.
And the route is divided two managers at Ichinoe Bridge. Besides, the road, which is eastern of the Ichinoe Bridge, is managed by East Nippon Expressway Company, and the route is toll road which is named as Keiyō Road from there.

History
4 December 1952 - First Class National Highway 14 (from Tokyo to Chiba)
1 April 1965 - General National Highway 14 (from Tokyo to Chiba)

Municipalities passed through
Tokyo
Chūō, Tokyo - Sumida, Tokyo - Kōtō - Edogawa, Tokyo
Chiba Prefecture
Ichikawa, Chiba - Funabashi, Chiba - Narashino, Chiba - Chiba

Intersects with

Tokyo
Routes 1 and 15
Route 17
Route 4
Route 6
Chiba Prefecture
Route 296
Route 357
Routes 51 and 126

References

014
Roads in Chiba Prefecture
Roads in Tokyo